Morton is a small unincorporated community in Clinton Township, Putnam County, in the U.S. state of Indiana. The town consists of little more than a general store, livestock sale barn and 18-20 houses.

History
A post office was established at Morton in 1857, and remained in operation until it was discontinued in 1905.

Geography

References

Unincorporated communities in Putnam County, Indiana
Unincorporated communities in Indiana